Choruqdayrron is a town in northern Tajikistan. It is located in Sughd Region. It is part of the city of Guliston.

References

External links
Satellite map at Maplandia.com

Populated places in Sughd Region